Events from the 10th century in the Kingdom of England.

Events
 902
 Irish Norsemen, expelled from Dublin, establish colonies on The Wirral.
 909
 King Edward the Elder and his sister, Princess Æthelflæd of Mercia, raid Danish East Anglia and bring back the relics of St. Oswald in triumph. Æthelflæd translates them to the new minster in Gloucester, which is renamed St. Oswald's Priory in his honour.
 Edward despatches an Anglo-Saxon army to attack the Northumbrian Vikings and ravages Scandinavian York.
 The Dioceses of Bath and of Crediton are separated from that of Sherborne, Athelm being appointed first Bishop of Wells and Eadwulf of Crediton. Æthelweard briefly serves as Bishop of Sherborne at about this time.
 910–920
Edward the Elder, King of Wessex, and his sister, Æthelflæd, Lady of the Mercians, conquer most of the Danelaw.
 910
 5 August – Battle of Tettenhall: Edward the Elder, King of Wessex, allied with the forces of Mercia, defeats a Northumbrian Viking army; Eowils and Halfdan and Ingwær, kings of Northumbria, are killed.
 911
 Edward transfers London and Oxford from Mercia to Wessex.
 Æthelred, Lord of the Mercians, dies and his wife Æthelflæd takes over rule as Lady of the Mercians.
 912
 Æthelflæd of Mercia begins to establish fortified burhs, including one at Bridgnorth.
 913
 Æthelflæd rebuilds the ruined town of Tamworth as a burh and capital of Mercia, also establishing a burh at Stafford.
 914
 Æthelflæd of Mercia establishes Eddisbury and Warwick as burhs.
 (or 923) Death of Plegmund, Archbishop of Canterbury.
 915
 First Battle of Corbridge: Viking victory over the Anglo-Saxons.
 King Edward occupies Bedford.
 Æthelflæd of Mercia establishes Chirbury and Runcorn as burhs.
 917
 King Edward captures Derby and seizes control of East Anglia. All Danes south of the Humber submit to his rule.
 918
 12 June – Æthelflæd of Mercia dies at Tamworth; Edward the Elder takes control of her kingdom.
 Welsh kings pay homage to Edward.
 Second Battle of Corbridge.
 919
Ragnall ua Ímair seizes control of the Kingdom of York.
 920
Norse Vikings under Sitric Cáech attack Cheshire.
 Constantine II of Scotland, and the kings of Strathclyde, York, and Northumbria acknowledge Edward the Elder as their overlord.
 c. 923
 Athelm enthroned as Archbishop of Canterbury.
 924 
 17 July – Edward the Elder dies and is succeeded by Æthelstan as King of Wessex.
 925
 4 September – coronation of Æthelstan as King of Wessex at Kingston upon Thames.
 926
 8 January – death of Athelm, Archbishop of Canterbury. He will be succeeded by Wulfhelm.
 30 January – a sister of King Æthelstan, perhaps Edith of Polesworth, is married to Sitric Cáech, the squint-eyed Norse King of Northumbria and Dublin (died 927), in Tamworth.
 Possible date (or 936?) – Conan is nominated as Bishop of Cornwall by Æthelstan.
 927
 King Æthelstan occupies York following the death of Sitric Cáech.
 12 July – King Æthelstan of Wessex claims his kingdom and receives the submission of High-Reeve Ealdred I of Bamburgh and probably also of Owain ap Dyfnwal, King of Strathclyde, at Eamont Bridge. He unifies the various small kingdoms of the Anglo-Saxon Heptarchy, creating the Kingdom of England, and also secures a pledge from King Constantine II of Scotland, that he will not ally with the Viking kings. This summer also Kings Hywel Dda of Deheubarth and Owain of Glywysing and Gwent submit to the overlordship of Æthelstan at Hereford.
 928
 King Æthelstan sets the border between England and Wales at the River Wye.
 King Æthelstan asserts authority over the Cornish, and sets the border of Cornwall at the River Tamar.
 The scribe known as "Æthelstan A" begins to draft royal charters.
 931
 Æthelstan holds the first Council of All England, at Colchester.
 933
 Æthelstan founds Milton Abbey in Dorset.
 934
 Æthelstan invades Scotland, reaching as far as Caithness.
 935
 Approximate date – Æthelstan mints the first coins proclaiming himself to be "King of All Britain" (Rex To[tius] Brit[anniae]).
 937
Battle of Brunanburh: King Æthelstan defeats Olaf Guthfrithson, the Norse King of Dublin, Constantine II, King of Scots, and Owain ap Dyfnwal, King of the Cumbrians. In thanksgiving for his victory, on his return Æthelstan grants Beverley Minster collegiate status (according to legend).
 939
 Failed expedition to support King Louis IV of France against Otto, King of East Francia.
 27 October – King Æthelstan dies at Gloucester; he is buried at Malmesbury Abbey and succeeded by his half-brother Edmund I.
 King Olaf Guthfrithson captures York.
 940
 King Edmund cedes Northumbria and the Five Boroughs of the Danelaw to Olaf Guthfrithson.
 King Edmund summons Dunstan to his court, where he becomes a favourite, and appoints him Abbot of Glastonbury, where he initiates English Benedictine Reform and revival.
 941 
 King Olaf Guthfrithson dies; Amlaíb Cuarán (Óláfr Sigtryggsson) succeeds him as King of Northumbria.
 12 February – death of Wulfhelm, Archbishop of Canterbury.
 Oda enthroned as Archbishop of Canterbury.
 942
 King Edmund re-captures the Five Boroughs.
 943
 Vikings take Tamworth.
 944
 King Edmund takes York from the Vikings.
 945
 King Edmund invades Strathclyde, and grants Cumbria to King Malcolm I of Scotland.
 946
 26 May – King Edmund is murdered by an exiled criminal at Pucklechurch and succeeded by his brother Eadred of England who is crowned on 16 August at Kingston upon Thames.
 947
Wulfstan I, Archbishop of York invites the Viking leader Eric Bloodaxe to become King of Northumbria.
 First record of Horsham.
 948
 King Eadred expels Eric Bloodaxe from Northumbria.
 King Malcolm I of Scotland raids Northumbria.
 949
 Óláfr Sigtryggsson returns as King of Northumbria.
 952
 Eric Bloodaxe reconquers York.
 King Eadred imprisons Wulfstan of York.
 954
 Eric Bloodaxe is killed at Stainmore allowing King Eadred to recover York, reuniting the kingdom of Northumbria with that of England, under the administration of Osulf I of Bamburgh.
 955
 23 November – King Eadred dies at Frome and is succeeded by his nephew Eadwig.
 956
 Dunstan exiled after quarreling with King Eadwig.
 957
 Dunstan re-founds abbeys at Bath, Exeter, Malmesbury, and Westminster.
 Mercia and Northumbria rebel, choosing Edgar as King.
 958
 2 June – death of Oda of Canterbury, Archbishop of Canterbury.
 959
Ælfsige enthroned as Archbishop of Canterbury but dies en route to Rome.
Byrhthelm enthroned as Archbishop of Canterbury.
 1 October – King Edy dies and is succeeded by his brother Edgar the Peaceful. Edgar overturns the appointment of Byrhthelm as Archbishop of Canterbury in favour of Dunstan.
 960
 21 September – Dunstan receives the pallium as Archbishop of Canterbury from Pope John XII.
 961
 Saint Oswald becomes Bishop of Worcester; he establishes or re-founds abbeys at Ramsey, Cambridgeshire, Evesham, Pershore, and Winchcombe. Ordgar, Ealdorman of Devon, founds Tavistock Abbey.
 963
 King Edgar grants legal autonomy to the Danelaw.
 Æthelwold becomes Bishop of Winchester; re-founds abbeys at Ely and (about 966) Peterborough (Medeshamstede).
 c. 970
 Regularis Concordia produced at Winchester.
 Oak tree begins growing in what will become Blenheim Park in Oxfordshire which will still be living in the second decade of the 21st century. 
 971
 15 July – the planned removal of the body of Saint Swithun during the re-building of Winchester Cathedral is delayed by 40 days due to rain.
 Kenneth II of Scotland raids England, reaching as far as Yorkshire.
 973
 11 May – coronation of King Edgar at Bath.
 Edgar sails to Chester, and receives homage from the rulers of Alba, Strathclyde, Wales, and the Kingdom of the Isles.
 Edgar has the coinage called in and re-struck as uniform pennies.
 975
 8 July – King Edgar dies and is succeeded by his 12-year-old son Edward.
 978
 18 March – King Edward is murdered by the servants of his stepmother Queen Ælfthryth at Corfe Castle. He is succeeded by his stepbrother Æthelred the Unready.
 980
 Vikings begin a new wave of raids on England.
 981
 13 February – start of a 7-day procession in which the bones of St Edward the Martyr are translated from Wareham to Shaftesbury Abbey, overseen by Dunstan and Ælfhere, Ealdorman of Mercia.
 Viking raids on Dorset, Devon, and Cornwall begin, and continue for a further seven years.
 985
 King Æthelred grants lands at Hēatūn to Lady Wulfrun by royal charter, thus founding what will become Wolverhampton.
 986
 Cholsey Abbey, a nunnery, is founded in the upper Thames valley by dowager queen Ælfthryth.
 988
 19 May – death of Dunstan, Archbishop of Canterbury. He is succeeded by Æthelgar.
 990
 13 February – death of Æthelgar, Archbishop of Canterbury.
 Sigeric the Serious enthroned as Archbishop of Canterbury.
 991
 1 March – Æthelred signs a treaty with Duke Richard I of Normandy, by which each agrees not to aid the others' enemies.
 August – Norse invasion force sacks Ipswich.
 10 August – Battle of Maldon: Danes defeat the English army, whose leader, Byrhtnoth, is killed.
 The first Danegeld, of £10,000, is paid to the Danes in return for their leaving England (according to the Anglo-Saxon Chronicle).
 993
 Danes raid Northumbria, destroying the original fortifications at Bamburgh Castle.
 994
 Norse and Danish armies ravage the south-east, but fail to capture London.
 £16,000 of Danegeld paid.
 Olaf II of Norway is baptised at Andover, and swears not to return to England.
 995
Ælfric of Abingdon enthroned as Archbishop of Canterbury.
 Aldhun, Bishop of Lindisfarne, moves his episcopal see from Chester-le-Street to Durham, to which the remains of Saint Cuthbert (d. 687) are translated.
 Ælfric of Eynsham completes his Catholic Homilies.
 997
 King Æthelred issues a law code at Wantage, defining the legal position in the Danelaw and introducing trial by jury.
 Ælfric of Eynsham completes the English Lives of Saints.
 998
 Danes raid southern and western coasts.
 999
 Danes raid Kent, attacking Rochester.
 1000
 English fleet invades the Isle of Man.
 English invasion of Cumbria fails.
 Heroic poem The Battle of Maldon composed.

Births
 902
 Dunstan, Archbishop of Canterbury (died 988)
 922
 King Edmund I of England (died 946)
 923
 King Eadred of England (died 955)
 943/44
 King Edgar of England (died 975)
 c. 950
 Sigeric the Serious, Archbishop of Canterbury (died 994)
 c. 962
 King Edward the Martyr (died 978)
 968
 King Æthelred the Unready (died 1016)

Deaths
 902
 5 December – Ealhswith, queen consort of Alfred the Great
 904
 John the Old Saxon, Abbot of Athelney (approximate date)
 908
 Denewulf, Bishop of Winchester
 909 – approximate date
 Asser, Bishop of Sherborne and scholar
 Wighelm, probable Bishop of Selsey
 911
 Æthelred, Lord of the Mercians
 912
 Wilferth, Bishop of Lichfield (approximate date)
 913
 Eadwulf II of Northumbria (killed)
 914 or 923
 2 August – Plegmund, Archbishop of Canterbury
 915
 Cutheard of Lindisfarne, bishop (approximate date)
 917
 Guthrum II, presumed king of East Anglia
 918
 12 June – Æthelflæd, Lady of the Mercians (born c. 870)
 920 or 922
 Æthelweard (son of Alfred)
 921
 Ragnall ua Ímair, Norse King of Northumbria and Mann
 924
 17 July – Edward the Elder, King of Wessex (born c. 871)
 2 August – Ælfweard of Wessex, King of Wessex
 926
 8 January – Athelm, Archbishop of Canterbury
 927
 Sitric Cáech, Norse King of Northumbria
 939
 27 October – Æthelstan, King of England (born c. 895)
 941
 12 February – Wulfhelm, Archbishop of Canterbury
 946
 26 May – King Edmund I of England (born 922)
 954
 Eric Bloodaxe, Norse King of Northumbria (born c. 895)
 955
 23 November – King Eadred of England (born c. 923)
 958
 Oda, Archbishop of Canterbury
 959
 Ælfsige, Archbishop of Canterbury
 c. 962/3
 Æthelwald, Ealdorman of East Anglia
 971
 Ordgar, Ealdorman of Devon
 973
 15 May – Byrhthelm, Archbishop of Canterbury
 975
 8 July – King Edgar of England (born c. 943)
 977
 30 April–2 May – Sideman, Bishop of Crediton
 978
 18 March – King Edward the Martyr (born c. 962)
 988
 Dunstan, Archbishop of Canterbury (born c. 909)
 990
 13 February – Æthelgar, Archbishop of Canterbury
 994
 28 October – Sigeric the Serious, Archbishop of Canterbury (born c. 950)

References